Harish Kapadia (born 11 July 1945) is a Himalayan mountaineer, author and long-time editor of the Himalayan Journal from India. He has been awarded the Patron's Medal of the Royal Geographical Society, the Life Time Achievement Award for Adventure by the President of India and the King Albert Mountain Award presented by The King Albert I Memorial Foundation. He has written numerous books and articles on the Indian Himalayas. Harish was awarded the Piolets d'Or Asia Life Time Achievement Award in 2017 for his mountaineering and exploratory endeavors.

Biography 
He began climbing and trekking in the range around Mumbai, the Western Ghats. His first visit to the Himalayas was almost 40 years ago. His main contribution to Himalayan climbing has been to explore unknown areas and, in number of cases, to open up climbing possibilities. Among his major ascents are Devtoli, Bandarpunch West, Parilungbi in 1995, and Lungser Kangri, the highest peak of Rupshu in Ladakh. He led eight international joint expeditions, five with British, two with French and one with Japanese mountaineers, to high peaks, such as Rimo I, Chong Kumdan Kangri I, Sudarshan Parvat, Padmanabh, and the Panch Chuli and Rangrik Rang groups.

He was carried by his companions for 13 days to the base camp where a helicopter rescued him. He was operated on for a dislocated hip-joint and had to spend two years walking on crutches, but that did not keep him out for too long and he has climbed for three decades after the injury.

Kapadia has a degree in commerce, law and management from University of Mumbai and he is a cloth merchant by profession. He has published twelve books. His Trek The Sahyadris has become a standard reference for all trekkers in the Western Ghats. His other books, Exploring the Hidden Himalaya (with Soli Mehta) and High Himalaya Unknown Valleys and Meeting The Mountains, cover his various trips to the Himalayas, while Spiti Adventures in the Trans-Himalaya covers climbing and trekking in that region. He has been the editor of the Himalayan Journal from 1980 to 1986, and since 1990, bringing the journal to international standards and continuing it as a major authentic reference on the range.

Kapadia has been elected an honorary member of the (British) Alpine Club. He was a vice president of the Indian Mountaineering Foundation (1997–1999). He was awarded the Indian Mountaineering Foundation (IMF) Gold Medal in 1993. In 2003, the Queen approved the award of the Patron's Medal of the Royal Geographical Society to him. He was also awarded the Tenzing Norgay National Adventure Award 2003 for lifetime achievement. He has been invited to many countries to lecture on his Himalayan exploits, and is a member of several organisations. He is married and lives in Bombay.

His son, Lieutenant Nawang Kapadia, who was commissioned on 2 September 2000 in the Fourth Battalion the Third Gorkha Rifles, died while fighting Pakistan-based terrorists in the jungles of Rajwar in the Kupwara district of Srinagar on 11 November 2000. Since then, Kapadia has lectured about this conflict, particularly in the Siachen Glacier. He has been discussing a proposal for a peace park in the Siachen glacier region and cleaning up the environmental damage there.

Kapadia has donated a substantial number of photographs and maps to the American Alpine Club and to the Swiss National Museum, which are setting up the Lt. Nawang Kapadia Collection. This is in addition to the Lt. Nawang Kapadia Library already in existence at the Himalayan Club.

His book, Meeting The Mountains can be seen while standing in the queue at Disney's Animal Kingdom for Expedition Everest. While passing along the line, one passes by many glass cases displaying the history of mountains and, at one point, there is what is supposed to look like an office with his book on the top bookshelf.

Due his long work as editor of the Himalayan Journal, Kapadia became an important chronicler of mountaineering.

On 3 November 2017, in Seoul, South Korea, Kapadia was awarded the Piolets d'Or Asia Life Time Achievement Award. He is the first Indian to receive this prestigious award for his outstanding career in mountaineering and exploration.

In appreciation of his authorship of many books and his stewardship of the Himalayan Journal as an editor for 35 years, he was further honoured by the Korea Alpen Book Club and made an honorary member.

Notable climbs 
Total peaks climbed: 33

First ascents: 21

Jatropani
Ikulari
Bethartoli Himal South (Garhwal)
Shiti Dhar (H.P.)
Devtoli*
Kalabaland Dhura*
Koteshwar II*(Garhwal)
Yada
Jalsu (H.P.)
Lagma*,
Zumto* (c.)
Tserip* (c.)
Kawu* (c.) (Spiti)
Kalanag
Bandarpunch West* (Garhwal)
Parilungbi
Runse*
Gyadung*
Geling* (c. )
Lama Kyent* (c.)
Labrang* (c.) (Spiti)
Nandi* (Garhwal)
Laknis*
Chogam
Skyang (East Karakoram)
Panchali Chuli*
Draupadi* (Kumaon)
Khamengar (Spiti)
Mangla*
Kunda*() (Kinnaur)
Lungser Kangri*
Chhamser Kangri() (Ladakh)
Bhagat Peak* (Garhwal)

Bibliography 
Exploring the Hidden Himalaya
Trek the Sahyadris
High Himalaya Unknown Valleys
Spiti Adventures in the Trans-Himalaya
Meeting The Mountains
Across Peaks and Passes in Kumaun
Across Peaks and Passes in Garhwal
Across Peaks and Passes in Himachal Pradesh
Across Peaks and Passes in Ladakh, Zanskar and East Karakoram
Across Peaks and Passes in Darjeeling and Sikkim Himalaya
A Passage to Himalaya (editor)
Trekking and Climbing in Indian Himalaya

References

External links 

 Harish Kapadia
 Citation for lifetime achievement award pdf
 More about Harish Kapadia from Himal Association
 Lt. Nawang Kapadia
 Lt. Nawang Kapadia Map Library
 Major explorations

1945 births
Living people
Indian mountain climbers
Historians of mountaineering
People from Pithoragarh
University of Mumbai alumni
Recipients of the Royal Geographical Society Patron's Medal
Recipients of the Tenzing Norgay National Adventure Award
Recipients of Indian Mountaineering Foundation's Gold Medal
People related to Lahaul and Spiti district